Kovaya is a small village in Rajula taluka in Amreli district of Gujarat It has balvatika and The Aditya Birla Public School is located in kovaya. It is rich in limestone deposits. India's one of the largest cement maker UltraTech Cement Ltd has a huge plant Gujarat Cement Works & its GCW township in  this village. This village is connected by road with National Highway 8E (India). It has very few public transport connecting nearby town Rajula. However GSRTC bus service is available to Ahmadabad & vadodara in morning & evenings

Villages in Amreli district